The Hindu Ghosi also spelled Ghosee trace their origin to King Dhumghosh, the professed ancestor of legendary King Yadu.

Origin

They also claim their importance saying that the sacred texts have mentioned them under the name of Ghosas. The term Ghosa refers to a settlement of the Abhira people or a temporary encampment of cowherds, which was the occupation of those people.

Colonial description

The largest subdivisions of Yaduvansh in Braj-Ahirwal area are the Ghosi, Kamariya, Phataks and Nandvanshis. However today they all recognise themselves to be Yaduvanshi or Krishnavanshi Yadavs.

In the Braj-Ahirwal region, the Ghosi and other subdivisions of Yaduvansh were gradually absorbed into the Nandvanshi category of landlords and into the Yaduvanshi subdivision as a consequence of British so-called "official" ethnographies and racial theories. The landlords liked the Yaduvanshi title because they considered it to be prestigious.

Distribution
In the Braj-Ahirwal area, the Ghosi are among the largest subdivisions, along with the Kamariyas, Gwalvanshis and Nandvanshis.

See also
 Ahir clans

References

Further reading

Ahir
Social groups of Bihar
Social groups of Uttar Pradesh
Social groups of Madhya Pradesh